The Houston Mayoral Election of 1995 took place on November 7, 1995. The race was officially non-partisan. Incumbent mayor Bob Lanier was re-elected to a third term.

Candidates

Incumbent Mayor Bob Lanier
Dave Wilson
Elizabeth Spates

Results

1995 in Houston
1995 Texas elections
Houston
1995
Non-partisan elections